is a 2010 Japanese film based on a true story of a dog trainer. It was released in Japanese cinemas throughout Japan on 14 August 2010.

Story
This movie is based on the true story of a female dog trainer, Kyoko Mochizuki, nicknamed "Anko", and a Labrador retriever which repeatedly fails the police dog trials despite numerous tries. Kyoko Mochizuki is an 18-year-old girl who dreams of becoming a police dog trainer. She is admitted to a police dog training school and meets a young Kinako, a Labrador retriever puppy. An instructor there informs Kyoko that Kinako is too weak to become a police dog, but Kyoko is determined that she will make Kinako into one.

Cast
 Kaho as Kyoko Mochizuki
 Yasufumi Terawaki as Seijiro Banba
 Naho Toda as Utako Banba
 Yusuke Yamamoto as Wataru Tashiro
 Kenichi Endō as Ryoichi Mochizuki
 Miyoko Asada as Sonoko Mochizuki
 Mitsuru Hirata as Takashi Sakuraba
 Ryohei Hirota as Keita Banba
 Momoka Ono as Niina Banba

Production

Theme song
The film's theme song was provided by the singer Metis. The theme song is a newly written piece of music, and is entitled .

Media

DVD
The DVD version was released on 14 January 2011.

Photo book
A photobook by Kaho, entitled “Breeze with Kinako”, was on 4 August 2010. The photos were taken at the filming location this movie.

Reception

Critical reception
Mark Schilling from The Japan Times, criticized the film for using "cliche after cornball cliche from local "guts-to-glory" films, while inflicting shot after shamelessly adorable shot of its title pooch and teen trainer" and gave the film a rating of 1.5 out of 5. He also derided the film's actress Kaho whom he described as "a bit old to pull it (her role) off". The reviewer also added that "the best actor in the film is the dog" and advised viewers who are looking for "stress relief with funny animal tricks" to "save time and try YouTube".

Accolades

References

External links
  
 

2010 films
2010s Japanese-language films
Shochiku films
Films scored by Takayuki Hattori
Police dogs in fiction
Films set in Kagawa Prefecture